David Morris is an American author. He is a founder and distinguished fellow of the Institute for Local Self-Reliance (ILSR).

Institute for Local Self-Reliance 
In 1974, David Morris joined with two other urban innovators, waste management specialist Neil Seldman and urban agriculture activist Gil Friend to found the Institute for Local Self-Reliance Located in the Adams Morgan neighborhood of D.C. The founders’ experiments included growing sprouts and worms in the basement and tomatoes in the rooftop greenhouse, installing the neighborhood's, and perhaps the city's, first solar hot water system and compost toilet.

Morris's additional experience with earlier neighborhood innovators provided the background for Neighborhood Power: The New Localism, Dr. Morris's 1975 book, written with Karl Hess.

ILSR became a resource for local, state and national efforts in alternative energy waste management, agriculture and other areas that demonstrated the ability of localities to capture their local wealth for local production and consumption

Publications

Books
 1973, We Must Make Haste Slowly: The Process of Revolution in Chile, Random House/Vintage Books
 1975, Neighborhood Power: The New Localism (with Karl Hess), Beacon Press
 1982, Self-Reliant Cities, Sierra Club Books
 1983, Be Your Own Power Company, Rodale, Inc.
 1992 The Carbohydrate Economy: Making Chemicals and Industrial Materials from Plant Matter, ILSR
 1994, The Mondragon Cooperative Corporation, ILSR
 2001, Seeing the Light, Regaining Control of our Electrical System, ILSR Press

Articles (selected)
 1979, "Entrepreneurial Cities", Western City Magazine, October 1979
 1981, "Humanly Scaled Energy", Fire of Life: The Smithsonian Book of the Sun, Smithsonian
 1988, "Healthy cities: self-reliant cities", Health Promotion, Oxford University Press
 1990, "Rootlessness undermines our economy as well as the quality of our lives", Utne Reader, May/June 1990
 1991, "Economic Shell Game", MinnPost, June 1991
 1992, "Save the Public Library", Media Culture Review, January 1992
 1994, "Communities: Building Authority, Responsibility and Capacity", State of the Union, Westview Press

Reports (selected)

 1975, “The Dawning of Solar Cells”, ILSR Press
 1979, "Decentralized Photovoltaics", (with John Furber), The Congressional Office of Technology Assessment
 1980, “Planning for Energy Self-Reliance, a case study for the District of Columbia", ILSR Press
 1994, "The Carbohydrate Economy: Making Chemicals and Industrial Materials from Plant Matter" (with Irshad Ahmed)
 1994, "Replacing Biochemicals for Petrochemicals: A Pollution Prevention Strategy for the Great Lakes Region" (with Irshad Ahmed)
 1995, "Restructuring Minnesota's Tax System: Taxing Pollution Rather than Work and Investment"
 1991, "Getting the Most From Our Materials: Making New Jersey State of the Art", (with Brenda Platt. et al.)

References 

Date of birth missing (living people)
Living people
American founders
American writers
Cornell University alumni
University of Florida alumni
Year of birth missing (living people)